P4P may refer to:

 Ring Magazine pound for pound
 Pay for performance (disambiguation), in health care, human resources, advertising, etc.
 Pay for perks, a business model in online games where players can purchase virtual assets.
 Pay for placement, an advertising method in which relevant ads are placed next to results from a search engine.
 Pound for pound, a term in combat sports used to describe a fighter's value in relation to fighters in other weight classes.
 Proactive network Provider Participation for P2P, a means for internet providers to optimize Peer-to-peer (P2P) traffic flow.
 Purchase for Progress, a United Nations World Food Programme initiative.
 Serosorting, otherwise known as "Poz4Poz" or "Poz4Play"
 Pay-for-Play, exchange of money for the privilege to engage in a specific activity

See also
 P2P (disambiguation)